Brynne: My Bedazzled Life is an Australian TV show, which follows the life of Brynne Edelsten, the wife of multi-millionaire Geoffrey Edelsten. The show was filmed primarily in Melbourne. In May 2013, there were rumours that the show would come back for another season. The series returned for a second season on 4 August 2014 titled Brynne: My Bedazzled Diary.

References

External links

Seven Network original programming
2010s Australian reality television series
2012 Australian television series debuts